Serving may refer to:

 Serving size
 Providing a non-material good, as in the work of a servant
 Supplying customers with food and drink, as in the work of a food server
 Service of process, the procedure for delivering a legal or administrative summons
 Serving channel, a type of file sharing channel
 Servitude (disambiguation)
 Worm, parcel and serve, a technique for protecting rope from abrasion

See also 
 Serve (disambiguation)
 Service (disambiguation)